Metropolitana FM is a radio station on 98.5 MHz in São Paulo, Brazil. The station carries a contemporary hit radio format.

History
Metropolitana FM first launched in 1982. However, it was not until 1996 that it was relaunched as a station targeting a youth audience.

References

Radio stations in Brazil